Aquasco Speedway, no longer in operation, was the first quarter-mile dragstrip on the United States East Coast.  It was built in the mid-1950s and was home to the President's Cup Nationals, which are now held at Maryland International Raceway.  Richard Petty, Shirley Muldowney, Don Prudhomme, Bunny Burkett are among some of the great drag racers who raced on the now defunct speedway.

To date, the site still exists.  Aquasco Speedway sits in Aquasco, Maryland, untouched and unvandalized.  The track was shut down in the 1970s.

In the early 1980s, the American Motorcyclist Association leased the land and build a small motocross track there.  No formal sanctioned events were held at the track, although there were many races held there by smaller, more local organizations.

External links
 Aquasco Speedway

Motorsport venues in Maryland
Defunct motorsport venues in the United States
Tourist attractions in Prince George's County, Maryland
Defunct drag racing venues
1957 establishments in Maryland
1978 disestablishments in Maryland